This is a list of Billboard magazine's ranking of the top country singles of 1966.

"Swinging Doors" by Merle Haggard ranked as the year's No. 1 single, despite its having peaked at No. 5 on the weekly charts.

"Almost Persuaded" by David Houston, which spent a record nine weeks in the No. 1 spot, ranked as the year's No.2 single.

See also
List of Hot Country Singles number ones of 1966
List of Billboard Hot 100 number ones of 1966
1966 in country music

Notes

References

1966 record charts
Billboard charts
1966 in American music